Billie Armstrong Brosch (August 5, 1924 – April 29, 2021), known professionally as Billie Hayes, was an American television, film, and stage actress, best known for her comic portrayals of Witchiepoo and Li'l Abner's Mammy Yokum.

Early years
Hayes was born in Du Quoin, Illinois, on August 5, 1924, to Charles and Marie (Armstrong) Brosch. Her father was from Germany, and was a coal miner who headed the local miners' union. Her mother was from Illinois, and worked in administration relief. She had an older brother, Louis Brosch. She started working professionally in entertainment at the age of nine, tap dancing in local theatres. By the time she was in high school, she played in bandleader Vince Genovese's orchestra, then toured with her own singing and dancing act throughout the Midwest. Hayes then moved on to New York City, where she auditioned for theatre owner/operator and producer J.J. Shubert, and was hired for principal roles in three roadshow operettas: The Student Prince, The Merry Widow, and Blossom Time.

Career
Hayes was best known for her comic portrayal of Wilhelmina W. Witchiepoo on NBC's Sid and Marty Krofft television series H.R. Pufnstuf, as well as in the 1970 film Pufnstuf based on the series. Her characteristic cackle and animated physicality were notable during the show's 17-episode run in 1969–70. She reprised this role in another Sid and Marty Krofft program Lidsville (while also having a regular role as Weenie the Genie), in The Paul Lynde Halloween Special (1976), and in the second (final) season of The Banana Splits Adventure Hour (September 6-December 13, 1969). Hayes portrayed a similar character in another television role as the gingerbread-house witch in Season 8, Episode 10 (1971) of Bewitched ("Hansel and Gretel in Samantha-Land").

Hayes played Mammy Pansy Yokum in the Li'l Abner 1956 Broadway musical, the 1959 film version, and a 1971 television special. In 1966, she toured with the national company of Hello, Dolly! starring Betty Grable. Hayes made television appearances on Murder, She Wrote, on the soap opera General Hospital as Robert Scorpio's mentor O'Reilly in 1981 and 1985, and in the role of Maw Weskitt in Episode 39 of the second season of The Monkees ("Hillbilly Honeymoon").

Her first voice work role was as Orgoch on the Disney feature film The Black Cauldron in 1985. Other voice work has included Mother Mae-Eye in the animated series Teen Titans, One-Eyed Sally in The Wacky Adventures of Ronald McDonald, Granny Applecheeks in The Grim Adventures of Billy & Mandy, and  roles on cartoons The Further Adventures of SuperTed, The Nightmare Before Christmas, Johnny Bravo, W.I.T.C.H., The Batman, TaleSpin, The Brothers Flub, Bubble Guppies, Rugrats, Transformers: Rescue Bots, Duckman, Shrek Forever After, Bonkers, Problem Child, Siegfried and Roy: Masters of the Impossible, and Darkwing Duck.

Hayes retired from acting in 2016.

Personal life 
Hayes was the president of the animal rescue organization Pet Hope, which she founded in 1984 to care for and find homes for abandoned animals. On her personal website, Hayes offered autographed photos for donations to Pet Hope.

Hayes died of natural causes at Cedars-Sinai Medical Center, Los Angeles, California, on April 29, 2021, at the age of 96.

References

External links
 
 
 
 

1924 births
2021 deaths
Actresses from Illinois
American stage actresses
American tap dancers
American television actresses
American voice actresses
People from Du Quoin, Illinois
21st-century American women